Fictibacillus macauensis is a Gram-positive, rod-shaped and spore-forming bacterium from the genus of Fictibacillus which has been isolated from a drinking water supply from Macau in China.

References

External links 

Type strain of Fictibacillus macauensis at BacDive -  the Bacterial Diversity Metadatabase

Bacillaceae
Bacteria described in 2006